Two Egg is a small unincorporated community in Jackson County, Florida, United States.

The origin of the name Two Egg is obscure. Some believe poor families during the Great Depression would trade eggs for goods at the local store, while others say two eggs were dropped by accident, causing the name to be selected. Two Egg's unusual name has attracted attention from writers.

References

External links

Two Egg, Florida Contains history, photos and other details about the town.

Unincorporated communities in Jackson County, Florida
Unincorporated communities in Florida